Cujubim is a municipality located in the Brazilian state of Rondônia. Its population was 26,183 (2020) and its area is 3,864 km².

The municipality contains 22% of the Angelim Extractive Reserve and 21% of the Ipê Extractive Reserve.
It contains the  Tucano Sustainable Yield State Forest, created in 1996.

References

Municipalities in Rondônia